St. Nicholas Orthodox Church is a Russian Orthodox church in Tehran, Iran.

History
At the end of the 16th century a monk Nicephorus, founded the first Russian parish on the land of Persia. A Russian spiritual mission was operating in Iran by the beginning of the 20th century, and by 1917 there were about fifty Russian Orthodox churches. Over the next three years, everything that had been created over the previous three centuries was lost. In the early 1940s, a Russian church reappeared in Iran thanks to the donations of Russian emigrants - St. Nicholas Cathedral, which was under the administration of the Russian Orthodox Church Outside Russia. In the 1980s and 1990s, the church was gradually abandoned, and in 1995, at the request of its parishioners, St. Nicholas Church was annexed to the Moscow patriarchate.

The Church is currently administered by Father Alexander.

See also
Russians in Iran
Russian Church, Qazvin
Iran–Russia relations

References

White Russian emigration
White Russian emigrants to Iran
Russian Orthodox Church Outside of Russia
Churches in Tehran
Iran–Russia relations
Christian denominations established in the 20th century
Eastern Orthodox organizations established in the 20th century
Russian Orthodox church buildings in Iran